Jana Šikulová (born 2 July 1988) is a Czech artistic gymnast. She is a multiple Czech national champion and a 2006 European Championships silver medalist on uneven bars.

She also won or medalled in multiple world cup events.

Career 

She was born in Brno. She started gymnastics aged six and reached the top of the Czech gymnastics despite having a vision impairment in her left eye.

Šikulová followed the steps of fellow Brno gymnast Jana Komrsková, being nicknamed "Small Jana" to distinct her from Komrsková.

Although being a top Czech gymnast for years, she did not make it into the olympic squad. Both in 2008 and 2012, she lost the internal Czech competition to Kristýna Pálešová.

In August 2014, Šikulová graduated from the Faculty of Sports Studies of Masaryk University with a Master's degree. She wrote her diploma thesis about the Yurchenko vault.

References

1988 births
Living people
Czech female artistic gymnasts
Sportspeople from Brno
Masaryk University alumni